Ethmia termenalbata is a moth in the family Depressariidae. It was described by Capuse in 1981. It is found in Cuba.

References

Moths described in 1981
termenalbata
Endemic fauna of Cuba